Thomas James Wise (7 October 1859 – 13 May 1937) was a bibliophile who collected the Ashley Library, now housed by the British Library, and later became known for the literary forgeries he printed and sold.

Collecting career
Wise began collecting books as a schoolboy, spending his pocket money at the barrows in Farringdon Street. He was a keen collector of first editions in original condition. His interests were poetry followed by drama and his collection dating back to Elizabethan publications was an exhaustive representation.

His collection was funded by selling duplicates and acting as an agent for wealthy collectors such as John Henry Wrenn. Wise was given an honorary M.A. degree by the University of Oxford and elected an honorary Fellow of Worcester College for his services to bibliographical science. He became a member of the Consultative Committee of the Friends of the Bodleian and was elected President of the Bibliographical Society in 1922–1924.

Forgeries and thefts
Wise became a noted bibliographer, collector, forger, and thief. He parlayed his international reputation as a collector of books and an exposer of forgers and forgeries into a career in creating and selling forgeries. He privately printed nearly 300 works of English authors, some of which were debunked as forgeries by Carter and Pollard.

In 1934 his reputation was damaged by the publication of "An Enquiry into the Nature of Certain Nineteenth Century Pamphlets" by John Carter and Graham Pollard. In their writing and exposé, Carter and Pollard were astute in their use of irony.  Carter and Pollard proved that a large number of rare first-edition pamphlets from 19th-century authors which depended solely on Wise's published works for their authenticity were fakes. Wise and a fellow bibliophile Harry Buxton Forman had been involved in the fabrication and sale of many of the same pamphlets to collectors.  Forman and Wise's crimes are generally regarded as one of the most notorious literary scandals of the twentieth century.

Shortly after Wise's death the Library was sold to the British Museum by his widow for £66,000. The works were compared with the British Museum's former collection at which point it was discovered that over 200 book leaves were missing and 89 of these matching leaves were found in the Wise volumes. John Henry Wrenn had built up a drama collection (housed in the University of Texas) and Wise had helped with supplying these volumes. Fannie Ratchford, Rare Book Librarian at the
University of Texas,  took suspected copies in the Wrenn library to England, where she was able to help the Museum check copies to see how many stolen leaves were to be found. Sixty of these books were also found to have been completed with thefts from the British Museum library.

A detailed scientific investigation by David Foxon was published by the Bibliographical Society in 1959 with the conclusion that Wise must have known that some of the book leaves added to his collection were stolen and that it was probable that he had taken the leaves himself; "In general it seems likely that Wise would not have risked sharing his guilty knowledge with an emissary but would have made the thefts himself; the rest of this study is written on that assumption."

A particularly noteworthy forgery, which he authenticated as genuine and original, was an edition of E. B. Browning's Sonnets from the Portuguese said to have been privately printed in Reading in 1847.

Personal life
In 1890 Wise married Selina Fanny Smith (aged 22) and they moved into 52 Ashley Road, Hornsey Rise (leading to the name of the "Ashley Library"). By 1895 Selina deserted her husband on the grounds that he was fully devoted to his book collection rather than their marriage. In 1897 they were formally divorced and Wise moved to St George's Road in Kilburn, northwest London (now Priory Terrace).

Wise remarried in June 1900 to Frances Louise Greenhaigh and dedicated the final volume of the Ashley Library catalogue to her.

Publications
Wise's published works included detailed bibliographies of Tennyson, Swinburne, Landor, Wordsworth, Coleridge, Ruskin, the Brownings, the Brontës, Shelley and Conrad. He was the copyright owner and co-editor of the Bonchurch edition of Swinburne's works.

Legacy
The bulk of his personal papers  consisting of 33 document boxes (13.86 linear feet), and 2 galley folders  are at the Harry Ransom Center of The University of Texas at Austin.  They are housed off site and require advance requests for examination. Another collection is at the Firestone Library at the Princeton University Library, Department of Rare Books and Special Collections.  It includes 0.2 linear feet, 1 half-size archival box.

References

Notes

Citations

Sources

 

Dearden, James S. (1969). "Wise and Ruskin," The Book Collector 18.no.1 (spring): 45-56.

Gearty, Thomas J., Jr. "Thomas J. Wise: A Brief Survey of his Literary Forgeries." The Courier 11.1 (1973): 51-64.
 
, 
Ratchford, Fannie. “The Wise Forgeries.” Southwest Review 25, no. 4 (1940): 363–77.

 at Internet Archive

Further reading

External links
 
 
 Thomas James Wise letters. Available online through Lehigh University's I Remain: A Digital Archive of Letters, Manuscripts, and Ephemera.
 
 A Bibliography of books by Thomas James Wise (6 June 2012) 33 works at Open library
 The Two Forgers cover
 Archival Material at 

1859 births
1937 deaths
Bibliophiles
British Library collections
British thieves
English book and manuscript collectors
Fellows of Worcester College, Oxford
English bibliographers
People from Gravesend, Kent
People from Holloway, London